Eichbach may refer to:

 Komorniki, Polkowice County (German name Eichbach), a village in the Lower Silesian Voivodeship, Poland
 Eichbach (Hahle), a river of Thuringia, Germany, tributary of the Hahle
 Eichbach (Weibersbach), a river of Hesse and of Bavaria, Germany, headwater of the Weibersbach